Manuel Modesto Seoane  (born June 26, 1955), is an American former professional baseball pitcher, whose Major League Baseball (MLB) career consisted of seven games for the Philadelphia Phillies and Chicago Cubs during the  and  seasons.  His minor league career extended though 1981.

He attended Tampa Catholic High School in Tampa, FL and was selected in the 6th round of the 1973 June Amateur Baseball Draft by the Philadelphia Phillies.

In January 1982, Seoane surrendered himself to police authorities along with fellow former MLB pitcher Mark Lemongello, for the kidnapping and robbery of Lemongello's cousins Mike Lemongello, a former professional bowler, and Peter Lemongello, a cabaret- / pop-singer. Seoane and Mark Lemongello were both sentenced to seven years probation after they both pleaded no contest to the charges.

References

External links

Manny Seoane at Baseball Almanac

1955 births
Living people
Baseball players from Tampa, Florida
Major League Baseball pitchers
Chicago Cubs players
Philadelphia Phillies players
Birmingham Barons players
Wichita Aeros players
Oklahoma City 89ers players
Evansville Triplets players
Reading Phillies players
Rocky Mount Phillies players
Pulaski Phillies players
American people convicted of robbery